Persepolis F.C. (women) is the women's football section of Persepolis F.C., based in Tehran, Iran.

History

1970s 
Women's football in Iran started in 1970. Women were participating in male football competitions in alleys and streets, and also took part in some men's football games. During that time, when numerous trainers participated in the top grade of FIFA's training courses in Japan, they were able to see the Japan women's national football team's games against female teams from Korea, Singapore and India. From 1970, serious measures were taken in order to reach appropriate standards. Thereafter, women took part first in football training and then in football teams such as Taj, Deyhim, Persepolis FC, Oghab FC and Khasram. By organising different competitions between those teams, the best players were selected and placed in the first Iranian women's national team. This team was composed of former volleyball players, basketball players and athletes aged from 12 to 18. They started to train more seriously as sport magazines published the news of their progress, then gradually a large number of female fans arose to support the team. With the help of educational institutions across the country, talented youngsters were scouted.

The first head coach for the winning women's team in Iran was Alan Rogers (from Persepolis), who was also the coach of the men's team at the same time.

Rebuilding the team in 2022 was on the agenda.

Affiliated clubs 

  AC Milan

  Rubin Kazan
  Beira-Mar

  Real Madrid

See also 
Reserve teams

 Persepolis Academy
 Persepolis B
 Persepolis Qaemshahr
 Persepolis Shomal

References

External links 

 Official club website 
 Persepolis F.C. at IFLO 
 Persepolis F.C. at FIFA 
 
 

Women's football clubs in Iran
Persepolis F.C.
Association football clubs established in 1963
Sport in Tehran